This is a list of episodes of the South Korean reality-documentary show Law of the Jungle. The show airs on SBS every Friday at 22:00 (KST) starting from October 21, 2011 till May 21, 2021.

List of episodes

Namibia

Papua

Vanuatu

Siberia

Madagascar

Amazon/Galapagos

New Zealand

Himalayas

Caribbean/Maya Jungle

Savanna

Micronesia

Borneo

Brazil

Indian Ocean

Solomon Islands

Costa Rica

Palau

Indochina

Yap

Brunei

Nicaragua

Samoa

Panama

Tonga

Papua New Guinea

New Caledonia

Mongolia

East Timor

Kota Manado

Sumatra

New Zealand

Komodo

Fiji

Cook Islands

Patagonia

Antarctica

Mexico

Sabah

Indian Ocean

Northern Mariana Islands

Chatham Islands

Thailand

Myanmar

Sunda Islands

Chuuk

Palawan

South Korea

References

Law of the Jungle (TV series)
Lists of South Korean television series episodes